Carrefour is a French multinational retail and wholesaling corporation.

Carrefour may also refer to:
Carrefour, a French word meaning road intersection
Carrefour, Ouest, a commune of Port-au-Prince, Haiti
Carrefour Express, a supermarket chain owned by the Carrefour Group operating in several countries
Carrefour Laval, a Canadian super regional mall located in Laval, QC, Canada
Carrefour Pleyel (Paris Métro), train station
Carrefour de l'Estrie, a Canadian mall located in Sherbrooke, QC, Canada
AS Carrefour, an association football club from Haiti
École du Carrefour, a Canadian high school
Mait' Carrefour, in vodou, a loa in charge of crossroads
 Carrefour (film), a 1938 French drama film